The Scotland Board of the Gaelic Athletic Association (GAA) or Scotland GAA is one of the county boards of the GAA outside Ireland, and is responsible for Gaelic games in Scotland. The county board is also responsible for the Scottish county teams. The Board participates with London, Gloucestershire, Hertfordshire, Lancashire, Warwickshire, and Yorkshire under the British GAA.

Football

Clubs

List

Men's Football Senior Championship top winners

Roll of honour

Senior Men's Football Championship

Senior Ladies' Football Championship

Junior Football Championship

Homegrown Football Championship

County team
Scotland fields a representative county team in the All-Britain Junior Football Championship. 2014 was a breakthrough year for the team as they lifted the All-Britain Junior title for the first time. The team had only ever made the final once before back in 2006, but lost the final, in extra-time, to Warwickshire. On the way to the title they beat Yorkshire and Kilkenny before beating Warwickshire in the final to a scoreline of 3-10 to 2-07.
This set up an All-Ireland Junior Semi-final with Cavan. However they were defeated on the day to a scoreline of 1-17 to 0-06. Most recently the Scotland Men won the All-Britain title in 2019 against a tough Warwickshire team. They went on to contest the All-Ireland Quarter Final versus Kerry.

In 2014, it was reported that Scotland would be joining the Connacht Championships in 2015 as part of GAA expansion plans throughout the UK. It was decided to put them in Connacht as opposed to Ulster to allow more rivalry between Scotland and London, but this ultimately didn't happen. This turned out to be an April Fool's joke.

2015 became a momentous year for the Scotland ladies team as they reached the All-Ireland Junior Final to be played at Croke Park. They beat Derry with a score line of 1-13 to 2-05 at Fingallians GAA ground. They played a tough game against Louth at Croke Park on 27 September 2015.

Hurling
In 1905, Lancashire and Glasgow entered the All-Ireland Senior Hurling Championship at the quarter-final stage. Lancashire returned for one more championship campaign in 1913, whilst Glasgow returned for the 1910 and 1913 championships. In 2019, Ceann Creige Hurling and Camogie Club, based in the Craigend neighbourhood of Glasgow, was formed. They have teams of all ages in hurling and camogie, ranging from minor to senior level. The Ceann Creige senior hurling team compete in the Lancashire Hurling League and the All Britain Hurling Shield.

References

 
GAA
Gaelic games governing bodies in the United Kingdom
Sport in Scotland